Spaceways is a 1953 science fiction drama film from Hammer Film Productions Ltd. and Lippert Productions Inc., produced by Michael Carreras, directed by Terence Fisher, that stars Howard Duff and Eva Bartok, and co-stars Alan Wheatley. Spaceways was filmed entirely in the UK. American Robert L. Lippert was an uncredited co-producer. The screenplay was written by Paul Tabori and Richard Landau, based on a radio play by Charles Eric Maine. The film was distributed in the UK by Exclusive Films Ltd. and in the United States by Lippert Pictures.

Plot
Engineer Dr Stephen Mitchell is part of a British space programme that plans to launch a satellite that will permanently orbit earth. At a cocktail party, it is announced to the programme's staff that the satellite project has been approved by the defence council. Mitchell's wife Vanessa is not enthusiastic about the new project, nor with having to live at its high security base. She sneaks away with Dr Philip Crenshaw, with whom she is having an affair. Dr Mitchell leaves the party with Lisa Frank, a mathematician on the project, who is in love with him. When Mitchell returns home, he has an argument with Vanessa; he had been made aware of her having passionately kissed Crenshaw after she left with him.

The satellite rocket soon launches, but it does not reach its maximum altitude. Afterward, it is discovered that Crenshaw and Vanessa have disappeared. Dr Smith secretly investigates their disappearance and comes to the conclusion that not only were the two murdered, but that they were murdered by Dr Mitchell, after which he hid their bodies in the spacecraft's fuel tanks. Smith approaches Mitchell with the accusation, while also telling him about Crenshaw being a spy, who had concealed having a degree from a German university.

Mitchell decides to go into space on the second rocket being launched, in order to try to prove his innocence. Smith discovers that there was a new team member added just prior to the disappearance, and that a security guard had died in an accident a week earlier. Soon after, Smith and the police discover that Crenshaw and Vanessa are actually at a seaside cottage. Crenshaw has been planning to head to the east instead of going to America, as he previously had said. During a violent scuffle between Crenshaw and Smith, Vanessa is accidentally killed.

After the rocket ship launches into space, Mitchell is surprised to see that Lisa is on board; she had previously convinced Toby to let her go on the flight instead of him. Despite the revelation that the bodies of Crenshaw and Vanessa are not on board, Mitchell and Frank attempt to jettison the spaceship's second stage, resulting in an explosion, causing their spacecraft to go out of control. Steve, however, releases the fail-safe, saving them from destruction and allowing the spaceship to return safely to Earth.

Cast
 Howard Duff as Dr Stephen Mitchell
 Eva Bartok as Dr Lisa Frank
 Alan Wheatley as Dr Smith
 Philip Leaver as Professor Koepler
 Michael Medwin as Dr Toby Andrews  
 Andrew Osborn as Dr Philip Crenshaw  
 Cecile Chevreau as Vanessa Mitchell  
 Anthony Ireland as General Hayes  
 Hugh Moxey as Colonel Alfred Daniels  
 David Horne as Minister

Production
Principal photography on Spaceways took place at Ray Studios, Windsor, England from mid-November 1952 to early January 1953. Some of the scenes of the spaceship taking off were special effects shots taken from the Lippert film, Rocketship X-M (1950) Some filming also occurred at Bray Studios in Berkshire.

Reception
Spaceways was not well received by critics, and its poor production values soon relegated the film to the bottom of cinema playbills and drive-ins, mainly as fill-in fodder. Film reviewer Glenn Erickson, writing in DVD Savant, noted: "The disappointment of Spaceways is finding out that it is really a lukewarm murder mystery in a science fiction setting".

References

Bibliography
Warren, Bill. Keep Watching the Skies: American Science Fiction Films of the Fifties, 21st Century Edition. Jefferson, North Carolina: McFarland & Company, 2009, (First Edition 1982). .

External links

 
 

1950s science fiction adventure films
British space adventure films
1953 films
Hammer Film Productions films
British science fiction adventure films
Films about astronauts
Films based on radio series
Films directed by Terence Fisher
Lippert Pictures films
British black-and-white films
1950s English-language films
1950s British films